Mahashila Rural Municipality (Nepali : महाशिला गाउँपालिका) is a Gaunpalika in Parbat District in Gandaki of Nepal. On 12 March 2017, the government of Nepal implemented a new local administrative structure, with the implementation of the new local governance structure, Village Development Committees have been merged to form Municipalities and Gaunpalikas. 

Mahashila is one of these 753 local units. It is subdivided into 6 wards. 
Mahashila Rural Municipality is surrounded by Syangja district on the East, Bihadi Rural Municipality on the West, Phalewas municipality on the North, and Paiyun Rural Municipality on the South. 
Mahashila is named after the name of Dhunwakot and Paiyun Dhunwakot. This region, which is important for a timely religious touristic view of the region, is the name of the Vishal Shila (a great stone of the world). The mountain of Golang is spread from south to south in the south side of the valley of Kaligandaki, situated in the village of Mahshshla.
Hosrangdi, Bhoksing, Balakot, Pakhapani, Lunkhu Deurali, Kurgha (Ward no 7 and 8) and Phalamkhani Village development committees (VDCs) were incorporated to form Mahashila Rural Municipality. This rural municipality came into existence on 10 March 2017.

Weather and Climate
In Parbat district, all kinds of water is found tropical, and temperate. Most of the cold water is found in the axis such as Dhunwakot, Chisapani, Golrang, covering the Mahabharat series starting from Panchase. Although all the parts of the Mahashila are pre-cordial, the warmth of the sunrise occurs. At the lower level, heat water will be found. Paiyun River (Seti Khola) is the area with origin. Maheshshila has constructed dozens of ponds on the hill tower due to lack of production in the water source.

Demographics
At the time of the 2011 Nepal census, Mahashila Rural Municipality had a population of 9,858. Of these, 79.4% spoke Nepali, 13.7% Gurung, 6.6% Magar, 0.2% Newar and 0.1% other languages as their first language.

In terms of ethnicity/caste, 22.7% were Hill Brahmin, 15.9% Kami, 15.8% Chhetri, 14.1% Gurung, 9.1% Magar, 9.0% Thakuri, 8.1% Sarki, 3.7% Damai/Dholi, 1.2% Gharti/Bhujel and 0.4% others.

In terms of religion, 79.6% were Hindu, 17.6% Buddhist and 2.8% Bon.

Looking at the population of Mahashila, Sucha as ward No. 1 in Hosrangdi 1599, Ward No.2 in Bhoksing 999, ward No.3 in Balakot 1313, Ward No. 4 in Pakhapani 239, Ward No. 5 in Lukhu 2747, Ward No. 6 in Phalamkhani 917 and the total population is 9857. In this village, the total population of Brahmin is 2302, the population of 1598 Kshetri, the population of Kami tribe is 1529, the population of the Gurung is 964, the population of Thakuri 809, the population of Sarki is 613, the population of Damai is 325 and the other population is 381.

The total area of the Mahashila Rural Municipality is 49.38 km2 (16.07 sq mi) and the total population of the rural municipality according to 2011 (2068 BS) Nepal census is 9857 1individual. The density of this rural municipality is 200/km2 (520/sq mi). This rural municipality is divided into 7 wards.

Landmarks
Chasapani Lake (2266 mi), Lake (Gorakhlang), worlds biggest Mahashila, Panyukot, Dhuwakot, Ekkanne Chaur, Gangadhar cave etc. are present in this village. There are historic heritage sites such as Paiyunkot, Dhunwakot, Chisapani, Balakot, Ranipaniin this Gaunpalika. Here is the Ganges of the Ganges, Chisapani forest, Forest of Golrang, Forest of Damsing, various Patan, Various Deurali, Man-made Home Stay. Himshila, it can be reached only from 3 hours to 4 hours from Pokhara.  

This Mahashila land is an outside area of 1,30,000 cubic meters. Local people also call it Maldhunga. Here, there will be regular prayers and special worship like Shivratri, Balachaturdasi, and worship of Lord Shivaji. It is said that worship is complete, good health and patience if worshiping here.

References 

Rural municipalities in Parbat District
Gandaki Province
Parbat District
Rural municipalities of Nepal established in 2017